Lewis and Clark State Park is a public recreation area located  northeast of Winlock in Lewis County, Washington. The  state park occupies one of the last major stands of old-growth forest in the state. The park's  include camping areas and trails for hiking and horseback riding. Evidence of the efforts of the Civilian Conservation Corps to improve the park in the 1930s can be found in the park's rustic shelters and restroom facilities.

References

External links

Lewis and Clark State Park Washington State Parks and Recreation Commission 
Lewis and Clark State Park Map Washington State Parks and Recreation Commission

State parks of Washington (state)
Parks in Lewis County, Washington
Protected areas established in 1922
Civilian Conservation Corps in Washington (state)